WNZE (1400 AM, "NewZee 105.5") is a radio station broadcasting a conservative talk format. Licensed to Clarksville, Tennessee, United States, the station serves the Clarksville-Hopkinsville area. The station is currently owned by the Five Star Media Group subsidiary of Saga Communications, through licensee Saga Communications of Tuckessee, LLC.

Programming
Two local programs are broadcast: Good Morning Clarksville (Monday-Friday, 6-9 AM) and SportsTalk with Justin Swallows (Monday-Friday, 3-6 PM). The station also carries most Clarksville Academy high school football and boys' basketball games. In addition to local offerings, WNZE serves as an affiliate of the University of Tennessee Vol Network for football and both men's and women's basketball. For decades, the station was an affiliate of the Atlanta Braves Radio Network but dropped the affiliation before the 2018 baseball season.

On March 17, 2021, WNZE changed their format from country to conservative talk, branded as "NewZee 105.5".

Previous logo

References

External links

NZE
Radio stations established in 1941
1941 establishments in Tennessee
News and talk radio stations in the United States